Chawalaleng is the Pilfers' second full-length album, and their first and only to be released on a major label. It was released on September 21, 1999 through Mojo Records.

Chawalaleng is a record that blends pop, metal, reggae, dub, hardcore, ska, and soul to create a musical genre that the band calls raggacore. The song "Legal Shot Pam Pam" was written by Coolie Ranx and originally recorded on The Toasters album Dub 56. The song "Climbing" was featured in MTV Sports: Skateboarding Featuring Andy MacDonald, released on the Sega Dreamcast.

Track listing
All lyrics written by Coolie Ranx & Vinnie Nobile.

"Agua" – 3:22
"Lay" – 3:16
"Climbing" – 3:18
"Mr. Exploita" – 2:51
"Choose Life" – 2:59
"What's New (Here We Go Again) – 3:09
"Why" – 3:39
"Hypnotized" – 3:33
"Chawalaleng" – 4:11
"Skungle" – 2:33
"Saga" – 3:56
"Legal Shot Pam Pam" – 6:55
"P.C." – 4:36
"My Time Now" – 5:07

Personnel
Coolie Ranx - Lead Vocals
Vinny Nobile - Trombone, Vocals
Anna Milat-Meyer - Bass guitar
James Blanck - drums
Nick Bacon - Guitar

1999 debut albums
Pilfers albums
Mojo Records albums